André Oktay Dahl (born 7 July 1975, in Lørenskog) is a Norwegian law graduate who was a politician representing the Conservative Party. He served as a representative of Akershus in the Storting and was first elected in 2005. He was a reserve candidate in the two previous periods, and took Jan Petersen's seat while Petersen was a cabinet minister from 2001-2005.

He was also elected to the regional Parliament of Akershus between 1999-2006, where he amongst others led the standing Committee on Scrutiny. Dahl has also led the Akershus Conservatives, his party's biggest regional party, between 2008-2012. During his time in parliament he focused on fighting homophobia, fighting for female rights, anti-corruption and fighting against child abuse. In January 2008 he made accusations that were considered harsh against controversial Norwegian defense attorney Tor Erling Staff who was then defense attorney for the suspected Pocket Man, a Norwegian pedophile predator. Attorney Staff had asserted that the bulk of the cases with which his client was charged amount to mere "peanuts". Dahl's position was that by downplaying the severity of the abuse, Staff in fact victimized the victims again. Dahl is a former victim of child sexual abuse, and he is also openly gay.

He was rewarded for both his work for gay rights as well as his openness about his own experiences of child sexual abuse. He was member of the board of several organizations working against homophobia and violence towards men as well as women.

Dahl served as his party's central spokesperson in judicial matters and was central in the discussions after the terrorist attacks in Norway after the 22nd of July in 2011. Occasionally he tried to get his party to discuss whether Norwegian anti-drug policy "worked" and if criminalization works. He is now a member of the think tank "Foenix" which works to get better help for people addicted to drugs.

After leaving the Norwegian Parliament, Dahl took the position as account director in Norway's biggest consultancy firm, Gambit Hill + Knowlton. He is still partly active in public debates, especially considering the core issues he engaged in when being an elected MP; child abuse, human rights and LHBT- issues.

In 2015 he withdrew his membership of the Conservative Party to become politically independent.

In an interview given to the weekend magazine "Dagbladet Magasinet" in March 2015 he stated the reason he left politics was that he wasn't sure any more about central political solutions by any political party and did not want to engage any more in party politics. He said he had been approached by several different parties, but wants to stay independent until he knows more about where he stands politically. He also stated that there were "no personal conflicts or dissatisfaction of not being given a position within the new Government" that made him withdraw. If he wanted a position he would "have asked for renomination", he added in the same interview.

Dahl is also known to be a former highly skillful clarinet player and planned to be a professional musician. Amongst others he served as solo clarinet player in his Majesty's Kings Guards band when he served in the Norwegian Army.

Storting committees 
 2009–2013 deputy leader of the standing Committee of Justice
 2005–2009 member of the standing Committee of Justice 
 2001–2005 member of the standing Committee of Scrutiny and Constitutional affairs.

References

External links 

1975 births
Living people
Norwegian people of Turkish descent
Members of the Storting
Conservative Party (Norway) politicians
Gay politicians
People from Rælingen
Norwegian LGBT politicians
21st-century Norwegian politicians
LGBT legislators
People from Lørenskog
21st-century Norwegian LGBT people
LGBT conservatism